Castavinol C3 is a castavinol, a natural phenolic compound found in red wines.

See also 
 phenolic compounds found in wine

References

External links 
 1996 : Les molécules des futurs millésimes Bordelais ? C. Castagnino, C. Chèze and J. Vercauteren, Bull. Soc. Pharm. Bordeaux, 1997, 136, pp. 19-36 (French)

Flavonoid glucosides